Vittorio Gallinari (born 22 October 1958) is an Italian former basketball player and current sports agent. He is the father of Danilo Gallinari, who plays for the Boston Celtics in the NBA.

He was born in Sant'Angelo Lodigiano. During his playing career, Gallinari was known as a tough defensive player. He was also a teammate of former Houston Rockets coach Mike D'Antoni.

References

1958 births
Living people
Sportspeople from the Province of Lodi
Italian men's basketball players
Olimpia Milano players
Italian sports agents
Scaligera Basket Verona players
Virtus Bologna players